Kurt Rusterholz (born 1 July 1927) is a retired Greco-Roman wrestler for Switzerland. He competed at 1960 Olympics as a light heavyweight (-87 kg) and finished in 12th place overall. He won a bronze medal at the 1953 World Wrestling Championships, and subsequently placed 6th at the 1962 event. He was additionally a six time Swiss national champion (1950, 1957–62).

In December 1955, Rusterholz represented Switzerland in a friendly international set of eight matches against Turkey in Zurich. In front of 500 spectators, he lost his match against Boecke. Turkey defeated Switzerland 8-0.

References

External links
 Kurt Rusterholz's profile at Sports Reference.com
  

Possibly living people
1927 births
Swiss male sport wrestlers
Olympic wrestlers of Switzerland
Wrestlers at the 1960 Summer Olympics
World Wrestling Championships medalists
Sportspeople from Zürich
20th-century Swiss people